Christian Harley Jantzen (born 7 November 1977) is an Australian sports, journalist, reporter and radio host. Jantzen was born in Sydney and attended Newington College. (1986–1995)

Career
He is a graduate of the Max Rowley Media School, and his final two years of high school were spent learning the trade of a sports journalist/reporter in the Sydney newsroom at Channel 9 before producing and hosting programs on Sydney radio station 2UE. He joined Fox Sports News in 2007. As a journalist Jantzen won "Best Sports Story" (Television) at the Queensland Media Awards in 2004 following his story on a 16-year-old Australian rules footballer who came back to play after being struck down with cancer and his brother donating some bone marrow for a life-saving transplant. His in-depth knowledge of sport is his best ATTRIBUTE as a reporter and his specialist sports are AFL, rugby league and cricket. After gaining experience at channels 7, 9 and the ABC in Sydney, he spent a year working with Channel 7 in Cairns before moving to Melbourne. Despite the fact that he has been able to report on just about every big sporting event, Jantzen lists his greatest event to cover was the Sydney 2000 Olympics, where he was a reporter/producer for Channel 7, but he thinks it doesn't get any better than a State of Origin rugby league match. He lists his favourite sport as rugby league, with a disturbing passion for Benji Marshall and the Wests Tigers. Jantzen also has a keen interest in tennis, golf, AFL and cricket.

References

1977 births
Living people
People educated at Newington College
Australian television presenters
Australian sports broadcasters
Australian sports journalists